"Typhoons" is a song by English rock band Royal Blood, and was released on 21 January 2021 as the second single from their third studio album of the same name. The song reached number 63 on the UK Singles Chart.

Composition
"Typhoons" is a song about being lost in one's own thoughts. In an interview with NME, Mike Kerr described how he believed "everyone can get lost in their own mind, and they can have dark spells in their own mind," and that he "wanted to write a song that recognised them, but was also uplifting and empowering." Musically, the song has been described as dance-rock and alternative rock.

Promotion
On 15 January 2021, the band released a short preview of "Typhoons" on their Facebook, Instagram, and Twitter pages, before officially releasing the song on 21 January.

The song is featured on the soundtrack of WWE 2K22.

Music video
The music video for "Typhoons" was premiered on 28 January 2021 and was directed by Quentin Deronzier.

Charts

References 

2021 singles
2021 songs
Royal Blood (band) songs